Anjaw District (Pron:/ˈændʒɔ:/) is an administrative district in the state of Arunachal Pradesh in north-east India. It was created district in 2004, by splitting off from  the Lohit district under the Arunachal Pradesh Re-organization of Districts Amendment Act. The district borders China on the north. Hawai, at an altitude of 1296 m above sea level, is the district headquarters, located on the banks of the Lohit River, a tributary of the Brahmaputra River. It is the easternmost district in India.
The furthest villages towards the border with China are Dong, Walong, Kibithu and Kaho.
 Anjaw is the second least populous district in India (out of 640).

History 
During the 1962 war, parts of Anjaw were briefly occupied by China. Being a disputed border region, Indian military has always been present in the Anjaw district. During the 2020 China–India skirmishes additional troops were deployed to the region.

Geography

Rivers

The main rivers are the following:
Lohit River (called Talu by local Mishmis)
Lam River
Tidding River
Delei River
Krowti River
Dichu River
Lati River
Klung River
Dav River
Telua River
Ampani River
Sarti River
Yepak river

Transport

The  proposed Mago-Thingbu to Vijaynagar Arunachal Pradesh Frontier Highway along the McMahon Line, (will intersect with the proposed East-West Industrial Corridor Highway) and will pass through this district, alignment map of which can be seen here and here.

Economy

Agriculture

The main crops are maize, millet, rice, beans, cardamom, orange, pears, plum, and apple.

Divisions

There is one Arunachal Pradesh Legislative Assembly constituency located in this district: Hayuliang. It is part of the Arunachal East Lok Sabha constituency.

The district has seven subdistricts called "circles":
Hayuliang
Goiliang
Chaglagam
Manchal
Hawai
Walong
Kibithoo

Demographics

According to the 2011 census Anjaw district has a population of 21,167, roughly equal to the nation of Palau. This gives it a ranking of 639th in India (out of a total of 640). Its population growth rate over the decade 2001–2011 was 13.77%. Anjaw has a sex ratio of 805 females for every 1000 males, and a literacy rate of 59.4%.

Tribes

The Mishmi, and the Zakhring (formerly called Meyor) are the main tribes in the district.

Tribal population is 16,451 (77.72%) as per the 2011 census, with the largest tribes being Idu/Taraon Mishmi (9,991), Kaman/Miju Mishmi (5,021), Degaru Mishmi (472), and Meyor (472).

Languages

Religion

Among the tribals, major religions are Hinduism (57.67%), Native faith (37.07%), Buddhism (3.15%), and Islam (0.99%). 
Among the non-tribals, the composition is Hinduism (76.36%), Islam (10.43%), Sikh (5.66%), Christian (3.54%), and Buddhism (2.65%).

Flora and fauna

The district is rich in wildlife. Rare mammals such as Mishmi takin (Miju: gheyam), Red goral, Gongshan muntjac, Leaf muntjac occurs while among birds there is the rare Sclater's monal (Miju: mankree). A pine, Pinus merkusii (Miju: Rok Sak) is found only in this district in the entire northeastern India. A flying squirrel, new to science has also its range in this district. It has been named as Mishmi Hills Giant Flying Squirrel, Petaurista mishmiensis.
Recently scientists found a new mammal species white cheek macaque.. it was first found in China in 2015 but its presence in India being noted recently. The discovery increased the total count of mammals in india to 438.

Banking Facilities

The list of banks functioning in Anjaw:

State Bank of India, Hawai
State Bank of India, Hayuliang Branch

References

External links

Official website

 
Districts of Arunachal Pradesh
States and territories established in 2004
2004 establishments in Arunachal Pradesh